General elections were held in Mozambique on 15 October 2014. Filipe Nyusi, the candidate of the ruling FRELIMO, was elected as President, and FRELIMO retained its parliamentary majority.

Electoral system
The President was elected using the two-round system. Incumbent President Armando Guebuza was constitutionally barred from seeking a third term.

The 250 members of the Assembly of the Republic were elected in 11 multi-member constituencies based on the country's provinces and two single-member constituencies representing Mozambican citizens in Africa and Europe. Seat allocation in the multi-member constituencies was based on proportional representation using the D'Hondt method, with an electoral threshold of 5%.

Campaign

Presidential candidates

Conduct
Electoral observers from the European Union stated there were positive aspects: new electoral legislation, a non-disputed voter register and a generally peaceful electoral campaign and an orderly election day, but issues with the tabulation process, and acts of violence and intolerance during the electoral campaign underlined the necessity for important improvements for the future electoral processes.

Electoral observers from the Mozambican Electoral Observatory group, concluded that their parallel vote count was broadly in line with the official results. However, the group still termed the elections "partly free and fair, and not very transparent", citing politicization and a lack of transparency of the electoral bodies, voters being turned away and other irregularities.

Results

President

Assembly

Provincial elections

Aftermath
The leader of RENAMO, Afonso Dhlakama claimed the results of the election were fraudulent and called for a national unity government, threatening to set up a parallel government if FRELIMO did not agree. However, he later abandoned the call. RENAMO also boycotted the swearing in of the provincial parliaments, and have threatened to boycott the swearing in of the Assembly of the Republic on 12 January 2015.

References

Presidential elections in Mozambique
Elections in Mozambique
Mozambique
2014 in Mozambique
October 2014 events in Africa